Myrsine degeneri, the summit colicwood, is a species of plant in the family Primulaceae. It is endemic to the island of Oahu in Hawaii.

References

degeneri
Endemic flora of Hawaii
Biota of Oahu
Trees of Hawaii
Taxonomy articles created by Polbot